Trilogy is the first compilation album by Canadian singer the Weeknd. It was released on November 13, 2012, through XO and Republic Records. It is composed of re-mixed and remastered versions of his 2011 mixtapes House of Balloons, Thursday and Echoes of Silence, and three previously-unreleased songs.

Trilogy received generally positive reviews from critics, who reinforced the previous acclaim of the mixtapes, although some found it indulgent. It was promoted with three singles and the Weeknd's concert tour during September to November 2012. The album charted at number five and number four in Canada and the United States, respectively.

Background 
In 2011, the Weeknd released a series of mixtapes—House of Balloons, Thursday and Echoes of Silence—and garnered both critical acclaim and a growing fan base. The mixtapes were principally recorded with producers Doc McKinney and Illangelo, at Dream House and Site Sound Studios in Toronto; additional sessions took place at Sterling Road Studios. The Weeknd released the mixtapes online as free digital downloads.

In September 2012, the Weeknd signed with Republic Records in a joint venture with his own imprint label XO. The mixtapes were subsequently remastered and compiled for Trilogy, along with three previously unreleased songs, which were recorded at Liberty Studios in Toronto. "Twenty Eight", "Valerie", and "Til Dawn (Here Comes the Sun)" were included as bonus tracks at the end of each of the compilation's discs.

To re-release the mixtapes' music for retail, the Weeknd had to obtain clearance from the recording artists he had originally sampled for certain songs, including Beach House's "Master of None" for "The Party & the After Party" and Siouxsie and the Banshees's "Happy House" on "House of Balloons / Glass Table Girls"; the sample of Aaliyah's "Rock the Boat" on "What You Need" was excluded from Trilogy.

Promotion 
A video accompanying the track "Rolling Stone" was released on October 3, 2012, to promote the album's release. The Weeknd previewed the album at a listening party in New York City on October 24. It was his first major media event. According to music magazine NMEs website, in an open letter to his fans the Weeknd posted on his website in regards to the "Rolling Stone" video, "Because I am a man of few words, I chose to make a viral video to show you how I felt and where I stand. I usually don't like to 'spoon feed' my audience because I grew up idolising story tellers who tell stories using symbolism, so it was in my nature to do the same. The "Rolling Stone" video takes place in a dimly lit studio which represents the two worlds I have been stuck in. The gloomy side represents the mainstream world while the other side represents the underground. The girl holding on represents you".

The video for his first official single from Trilogy, a revamped version of "Wicked Games", was released just weeks later on October 18, 2012, again through his website. Chris Martins of Spin describes the video, "The clip is almost a sequel to the similarly shot "Rolling Stone" video, wherein a woman draped over the singer's back mysteriously disappears by the song's end. This time, the shot opens on a dancing, purse-lipped model type, but her shadow soon vamps away from her body, and torments Tesfaye until the track's end".

The album's lead single "Wicked Games" was released on October 22, 2012. The song charted at number 43 on the Canadian Hot 100, it reached number 53 on the US Billboard Hot 100 and number 13 on the US Hot R&B/Hip-Hop Songs.

His fourth video release, and third to promote Trilogy, was for "The Zone", a collaboration with fellow Toronto musician, rapper Drake. This video had been rumoured for months and was a popular track given the collaboration of OVOXO, a crew formed by Drake and the Weeknd. The video was released on November 7, 2012, and is described by music blog Pretty Much Amazings review as having  "a lot of camera obscura effects, a forest of multicolored balloons, lens flare that would make J. J. Abrams jealous, a woman dancing in lace lingerie, and Drake. It's a fitting video – its film noir, Twin Peaks-y vibe perfectly matches the track's subtle sexy-creepy energy".

The second single "Twenty Eight" was released on November 13. The Weeknd toured in support of Trilogy during September to November 2012. "The Zone" was released as the album's third and final single three days later.

With Trilogy now on iTunes and in stores, the Weeknd turned to his fifth official video, one of his three new releases from his debut, "Twenty Eight". Dropped on February 13, 2013, and directed by up-and-coming visionary Nabil Elderkin (some may notice similarities to Frank Ocean's "Pyramids" video which he also directed). Simren Bolaria of music blog Earmilk, describes the video, "A long way from his former faceless, anti-media Internet persona, a distracted Abel Tesfaye sits down for a grey and dreary television interview with a foreign journalist while a haunting hologram girl sits in bed watching from her own television set. He's under surveillance—the crew is watching, hologram girl is watching, and the reporter is talking at him, so he dips into mental absence. The Weeknd continues to slip back into his alternate stripper world where the lights are flashing, the strippers don't get tired, the décor is decadent, and he can do the watching himself, with a camcorder in hand, of course. The line between what's real and what's imagined is blurred, but one thing is clear—this video is definitely NSFW".

Critical reception 

Trilogy was met with generally positive reviews. At Metacritic, which assigns a normalized rating out of 100 to reviews from professional publications, the album received an average score of 79, based on 19 reviews. Aggregator AnyDecentMusic? gave it 8.1 out of 10, based on their assessment of the critical consensus.

John Calvert of Fact dubbed it "an r'n'b album with few equals in terms of narrational ambition". Oliver Keens of Time Out wrote that the Weeknd "communicates" his character "so engagingly on Trilogy" and found him "riveting when he juxtaposes debauchery with a delivery that finds him numb and on the verge of tears". Killian Fox of The Observer felt that the mixtapes' "production sounded great to start with" and that the "new material is unexceptional", but ultimately stated, "if you didn't pick up the mixtapes when they were going free, and can handle 160 minutes of beautifully crafted nihilism, this is an essential buy". Although he found the new songs "arbitrary in terms of sequencing", Pitchforks Ian Cohen cited the compilation as "some of the best music of the young decade; judging by its already pervasive influence, it's safe to say Trilogy (or at least House of Balloons) will be one of those records that will be viewed as a turning point when we look at the 2010s as a whole".

In a mixed review, AllMusic's Andy Kellman felt that, despite moments when he is "distinctively gripping", the Weeknd lacks "restraint, as he is prone to repetitious whining that is more young boy than young Keith Sweat". Kellman wrote that "now that he's with a label, he'll hopefully get some kind of filter that enables him to fulfill the promise heard in these 160 minutes of one-dimensional, occasionally exhilarating overindulgence ... His potential is as obvious as his lyrics are toxic". Kevin Ritchie of Now found the music "impressive", but found the "lyrical ambivalence" to be "a bit one-note" by the album's second hour. Although he found its "excess oppressive" when listened to in its entirety, Drowned in Sounds Robert Leedlum deemed Trilogy to be "untouchable" as a "comprehensive document of a specific moment in time". Paul MacInnes of The Guardian wrote that its three discs "offer a rough trajectory of party, after-party and hangover, through which an assertive voice gives way to one that sounds more troubled", and concluded, "Trilogy does remove some of the Weeknd's mystique – lyrical formulae become apparent, and examples of engaging melody recede as the collection advances. Whatever its limits, however, Trilogy remains a striking piece of work".

Commercial performance 
Trilogy charted at number five on the Canadian Albums Chart. In the United States, it debuted at number four on the Billboard 200, with first-week sales of 86,000 copies. By August 2015, the release has sold 558,000 copies in the United States. On March 18, 2019, Trilogy was certified triple platinum by the Recording Industry Association of America (RIAA). On June 10, 2022, the album was certified triple platinum by Music Canada.

Track listing 

Sample credits
  "House of Balloons / Glass Table Girls" contains elements of "Happy House", written by Susan Ballion, Peter Clarke, John McGeoch and Steven Severin; and a sample of "Happy House", as performed by Siouxsie and the Banshees.
  "The Party & the After Party" contains elements of "Master of None", written by Victoria Legrand and Alex Scally; and a sample of "Master of None", as performed by Beach House.
  "Loft Music" contains elements of "Gila", written by Victoria Legrand and Alex Scally; and a sample of "Gila", as performed by Beach House.
  "The Knowing" contains elements of "Cherry Coloured Funk", written by Elizabeth Fraser, Robin Guthrie and Simon Raymonde; and a sample of "Cherry Coloured Funk", as performed by Cocteau Twins.
  "Life of the Party" contains elements of "Drugs in My Body", written by Björn Berglund, Pontus Berghe, Anthony Grier and Vini Reilly.
  "The Birds, Pt. 2" contains elements of "Sandpaper Kisses", written by Nicholas Bird, Steve Crittall, Alex McGowan and Martina Topley-Bird.
  "Montreal" contains elements of "Laisse tomber les filles", written by France Gall.
  "Outside" contains elements of "Go Outside", written by Madeline Follin and Ryan Mattos.
  "Initiation" contains elements of "Patience", written by Georgia Anne Muldrow; and a sample of "Patience", as performed by Georgia Anne Muldrow.

Personnel 
Credits for Trilogy adapted from liner notes.

 Matthew Acton – assistant engineer, engineer
 Hyghly Alleyne – executive producer
 Rainer Millar Blanchaer – musician, producer
 William Brock – guitar
 Noel Cadastre – assistant engineer
 Clams Casino – musician, producer
 Drake – featured artist
 Dream Machine – producer
 Drop – artwork, design, executive producer
 DropXLife – musician, producer
 Adrian Eccleston – guitar
 Adrien Gough – musician
 Patrick Greenaway – guitar
 Juicy J – featured artist, vocals

 Shin Kamiyama – assistant engineer
 Doc McKinney – engineer, executive producer, instrumentation, musician, producer
 Carlo "Illangelo" Montagnese – engineer, executive producer, instrumentation, mixing, musician, producer
 Jeremy Rose – engineer, musician, producer
 Mark Santangelo – mastering
 Noah "40" Shebib – engineer
 Ben Swantek – design
 La Mar Taylor – executive producer, photography
 Henry Walter – engineer, musician
 The Weeknd – executive producer, musician, primary artist, producer
 Jake Wilson – executive producer

Charts

Weekly charts

Year-end charts

Certifications

Release history

See also 
 List of Billboard number-one R&B albums of 2012

References

External links 
 
 

2012 compilation albums
2012 debut albums
Albums produced by Illangelo
Republic Records compilation albums
The Weeknd albums
Juno Award for R&B/Soul Recording of the Year recordings
Albums produced by the Weeknd